This is a list of characters for the manga series Karakuri Circus written and illustrated by Kazuhiro Fujita.

Main characters

A young boy who is the illegitimate son of the C.E.O. of the Saiga corporation and his mistress. His father left him 18 billion yen as part of a plan to use Masaru as bait to trigger the destruction of the Kuroga clan who engaged the Saiga to build their puppets. Masaru is now the target of his father's siblings who hire assassins with puppets to abduct or kill the boy to get his money.

A tall, strong young man who practices the Chinese martial art Xing Yi Quan but suffers from the Zonapha syndrome. This syndrome causes difficulty in breathing and the only cure is to make someone laugh, however he is not very funny. He decides to protect Masaru after encountering the boy being attacked in the street.

She came to Japan to protect Masaru and repay the debt to Masaru's grandfather for helping her family. She becomes Masaru's bodyguard/caretaker and controls Harlequin, one of the most powerful puppets in the story.

Saiga Family

Masaru's grandfather and master puppeteer who married Angelina with whom he had their daughter Éléonore.

Masaru's father and C.E.O. of the Saiga corporation. His former name is Dean Maistre who is the incarnation of Bai Jin and he was adopted by Shōji Saiga. He intended to use his illegitimate son Masaru's body as a receptacle for his memories to continue his existence. When he died he left his fortune to Masaru, whom he used as bait to trigger the destruction of the Kuroga clan who engaged the Saiga to build their puppets.

One of Masaru's uncles who kidnaps the boy and tries to adopt him in an effort to inherit his brother's fortune.

Daughter of Lucille and one of the first Shirogane who held the Soft Stone within her body. She married Shōji Saiga and gave birth to their daughter Éléonore to whom she transferred the Soft Stone.

 Daughter of Shōji and Angelina Saiga who inherited the Soft Stone from her mother Angelina.

Nakamachi Circus

Head of the Nakamachi Circus and husband of Fusae who died during a circus performance.

The older son of Shinobu Nakamachi and reliable big-brother figure to Hiro.

The younger son of Shinobu Nakamachi.

A young girl working in Nakamachi Circus as the animal handler and beast tamer of the lion called Drum. Her family were wild beast tamers in the Great Long Circus until her sister was killed by a tiger named Beast.

 She is a master knife-thrower and assassin hired to kill Masaru, but instead joins the Nakamachi Circus. Her brother died from Zonapha syndrome and she harbors a strong hatred for automated puppets due to a past incident.
Morobi Mitsu'ushi
He is the ringmaster of the Straw Circus, the circus Narumi and Shirogane were working for at the beginning of the series. He is vain, refusing to help the Nakamachis at first and trying to win over Shirogane to come back to the Straw Circus. After the Straw Circus goes bankrupt from he and his son Naota's embezzlement of funds, he ends up joining the Nakamachi Circus. He only appears in the manga.
Naota Mitsu'ushi
He is a member of the Straw Circus who harbors romantic feelings for Shirogane. Along with his father, he joins the Nakamachi Circus after the Straw Circus goes bankrupt. He only appears in the manga.

Midnight Circus
A circus of Automatons led by the four master automatons known as Les Quatre Pionniers (The Four Pioneers) that travel while spreading Zonapha syndrome in hopes of one day fulfilling their late master/makers final wish "to make Francine smile/laugh".

The queen of the Midnight Circus. She is a highly complex automaton who was created to be her master's bride of sorts, but no matter what he did she would not smile. He then created four powerful master automatons based on the designs of clowns and jesters with the sole purpose of making her smile . Since his passing, she has assumed the role of leader and has created many other automatons to realize her master's desire of making her laugh. Her solution was to spread the Zonapha syndrome. She hopes to find someone with the soft stone which is the key element in making aqua vitae which is supposed to grant life so she can become "alive".

One of the four master automatons, he is the musician of the circus. His clothes are all white and his instrument is a mandolin. He is thoughtful and seems quite proud. His attacks involves the manipulation of fire.

One of the four master automatons, he is the ball walker of the circus. He is quick to anger and is the most irresponsible of the four. His main form of attack is using his arms which possess a very high level of strength making him the physically strongest of the circus.

One of the four master automatons, he is the juggler  of the circus. He wants to know what the word "delicious" means. He can extend his arms and uses his hat as a weapon which has a razor sharp brim.

The only woman among the four master automatons, she is the acrobat/rope walker of the circus and can jump very high. She wants to live a love story like the ones she's read in books, the only flaw is that she cannot feel the sensation of the skin of another person. Her weapons are Les Mains Blanches Immaculeés (Immaculate White Hands).

Shirogane-O

A man wearing a stretchable mask who was separated from his true love by her mistrustful mother who then married her off to an automaton. He became a Shirogane after the automaton killed her, and was saved from the Zonapha syndrome by Lucille. He went on to create the Sirogane-Os, such as Zed, Fatima, Rockenfield, Timbavati, Schwarzes Tor and Malina (Mina), survivors of the Zonapha syndrome and now desiring vengeance against all automatons. He is  the reincarnation of Bai Jin, who transferred his memories into a young Bai boy and then called himself Dean Maistre who was later adopted by Shōji Saiga and became Sadayoshi Saiga. He is the latest identity of Sadayoshi Saiga.
Naya Steele

A female Shirogane-O working under Faceless. She serves as the General Leader of the US Division of the Shirogane-O. She is the first to die during the assault on the Midnight Circus but later appears in a new body.
Malina (Lina)

A young female Sirogane-O who is involved in the fight against Les Quatre Pionniers. Her arms and legs can become high-speed drills to attack an adversary.

Other characters

An elderly woman who works with Guy Christoph Resh and helps Narumi search for the Midnight Circus. She is almost 200 years old and a survivor from the village of Quiberon after drinking the Aqua Vitae created by Yin. To keep the  Aqua Vitae producing soft stone as a safeguard against the automata, she hid it within her daughter Angelina otherwise it would dissolve within 2 weeks.

He is a member of the Slaughter Team, hired to kill Masaru and controls the puppet Pulcinella.

He works at the hospital run by Dr. Banhart which is a research facility and orphanage for children suffering from Zonapha syndrome. He uses the last amount of Aqua Vitae to save Narumi after he is fatally wounded and loses his arm.

He is the Chinese master who taught Narumi Katō martial arts and contracted Zonapha syndrome. His ancestor created Aqua Vitae 200 years earlier.

 Daughter of Liang Jian-Feng and helps Narumi search for the Midnight Circus.

A young female Shirogane who has jurisdiction of an area in the central Sahara Desert. She acts as the leader of the ground assault on the Midnight Circus.

An African male Shirogane who is involved in the fight against Les Quatre Pionniers. His marionette is called Mamba and it uses its Tower of Venomous Fangs to attack an adversary.

A middle-aged male Shirogane who is involved in the fight against Les Quatre Pionniers. His marionette is called Pentagona Knocker.

A male Shirogane with long white hair who is involved in the fight against Les Quatre Pionniers. His marionette is also called Schwarzes Tor.

Historic characters

Ancestor of Liang Jian-Feng who studied alchemy with his younger brother in Prague, 200 years earlier. His appearance is very similar to that of Narumi Katō. He proposed to Francine and offered to sacrifice his study of alchemy to help feed the poor.  He created the ruby-coloured "soft stone" that produces Aqua Vitae, when it is immersed in water which is activated by the addition of a human soul. While traveling the world he encountered a young Shōji Saiga who he trained in the arts of medicine, alchemy and puppetry. He became the effective founder of the Shiroganes (taken after his name when converted into Japanese by Shoji), after he dissolved his essence into Aqua Vitae for Zonapha victims to drink.

Younger brother of Yin who was devastated and filled with anger after Francine accepted Yin's proposal of marriage. He also created Aqua Vitae and used it to animate his mechanical Francine and the automatons of the Midnight Circus, Pantalone, Arlecchino, Dottore and Columbine. He also created and infected the nearby village with Zonapha syndrome in an effort to make his Francine automaton laugh. Before he died, who transferred his memories into a young Bai boy by using his hair soaked in Aqua Vitae. He then called himself Dean Maistre who was later adopted by Shōji Saiga and became Sadayoshi Saiga.

A beautiful young woman whose appearance is very similar to that of Shirogane Saiga. She escaped from a French slave trader and survived as a poor street seller living in Prague, helping to feed orphans and the poor where she was branded as a thief for stealing and egg to feed a sick boy. She met and befriended the Bai brothers, Yin and Jin, and agree to marry Yin. She was abducted by the insanely jealous Jin and died in a village prison 9 years later when it was set on fire.

References

External links
  
  
 

Karakuri Circus